Gregory "Greg" Starr is a Tokyo-based writer, translator and editor who occasionally did voice work for Frontier Enterprises until its closure in 2000.

Biography 
In 1970, Starr left Tennessee to study at the Sophia University in Tokyo, Japan. To pay for the tuition, he drove meat delivery trucks, wrote lyrics for bands and would lend his voice to English-dubbed versions of Shochiku's Tora-San films.

Starr is currently still working as a translator in Japan and has occasionally written articles for CNN Travel. He currently lives in Akiya, a village on the coast southwest of Tokyo.

Filmography

Anime Films 

 Lupin the 3rd: The Mystery of Mamo (1978) - Detective Ed Scott, Flinch, Dietman (Frontier Dub)
 Swan Lake (1981) - Adolph (Frontier Dub)
 Aladdin & the Wonderful Lamp (1982) - Additional Voices (Frontier Dub)
 The Dagger of Kamui (1985) - Oguri, Sanpei

References 

  Content in this article was copied from Greg Starr at Dubbing Wikia, which is licensed under the Creative Commons Attribution-Share Alike 3.0 (Unported) (CC-BY-SA 3.0) license.

External links 
 
 

Living people
Year of birth missing (living people)
American male voice actors
American expatriates in Japan
American writers
American translators
American editors
20th-century American male actors